Lysimachia or Lysimachea or Lysimacheia (Λυσιμάχεια) was a small town in ancient Mysia, mentioned only by Pliny the Elder, in whose time it no longer existed.

Its site is tentatively located near the modern Hatıplar in İzmir Province, Turkey.

References

Populated places in ancient Mysia
Former populated places in Turkey
History of İzmir Province